NGC 168 is a lenticular galaxy located in the constellation Cetus. It was discovered in 1886 by Frank Muller.

References

External links
 

0168
Lenticular galaxies
Cetus (constellation)
002192